Pathar Mosque, known locally as Naev Masheed (Kashmiri: / ˈnəw ˌməʃiːd̪ /), is a Mughal era stone mosque located in the old city of Srinagar, in the Indian state of Jammu and Kashmir. It is located on the left bank of the River Jhelum, just opposite the shrine of Khanqah-e-Moula. It was built by Mughal Empress Noor Jehan, the wife of emperor Jehangir, in 1623, for Shi’a Muslim Population. The mosque has some distinct features that separate it from the rest of the mosques in the Kashmir Valley. Unlike other mosques, it does not have the traditional pyramidal roof. Furthermore, the mosque has nine mehraabs (arches), with the central one being larger than the others.

References

External links 
 

Buildings and structures in Srinagar
Mosques in Jammu and Kashmir
Mosques completed in 1623

Mughal mosques